The Steinbach Huskies are a junior and senior ice hockey club based in Steinbach, Manitoba, Canada.

Senior Huskies
Founded in the 1920s, the Senior Huskies have played in several leagues over the years: the Hanover-Tache Hockey League (1953–2003), Manitoba Eastern Hockey League (1969–1977), the Central Amateur Senior Hockey League (1977–1985) and currently the Carillon Hockey League.

In 1978–79, the Huskies captured the Allan Cup Western Canadian title before losing in the national finals.

In 1992–93, the Huskies beat the Niverville Clippers to win the Hanover-Tache Hockey League Championship.

The Senior Huskies joined the Carillon Senior Hockey League (CSHL) in 2004 and played in every season, except for leaves of absence taken for the 2006–07, 2017–18, and 2018–19 seasons. They have captured three league championships and also one Manitoba Provincial Senior 'A' championship (2009–10).

CSHL Championships

 2009–10
 2010–11
 2014–15

Junior Huskies

The Junior Huskies are a founding member of the Hanover Tache Junior Hockey League. The team has won a league-best eight championships, which also makes them eight-time Provincial Junior 'C' champions, as the HTJHL is the only junior 'C' league sanctioned by Hockey Manitoba.

HTJHL Championships

1988–89
1989–90
2004–05
2005–06
2006–07
2008–09
2011–12
2013–14

See also
List of ice hockey teams in Manitoba

References

External links
 HTJHL Website
 CSHL Website

Ice hockey teams in Manitoba
Senior ice hockey teams
Sport in Steinbach, Manitoba
1920s establishments in Manitoba